The U-Men are a group of supervillains appearing in American comic books published by Marvel Comics. They are depicted usually as adversaries of the X-Men.

Publication history
The U-Men are a collection of characters that first appeared in Grant Morrison's run on New X-Men where they were created by Grant Morrison and Leinil Francis Yu. They believe in using mutant body parts to augment their human bodies as well as to grant themselves superhuman powers. They also live in specially designed environment suits to protect them from what they believe to be an imperfect world. Until his death, they were led by John Sublime.

Fictional history
A group of U-Men track down a young girl named Angel Salvadore, who manifested fly-related mutant powers. They are about to dissect her in a mobile-lab by the side of the road when Wolverine finds them and attacks, having been searching for Angel with the help of Jean Grey. All the soldiers are killed and Angel is taken into the care of the X-Men.

A little after Angel is rescued, a squadron of U-Men attack through the front gate of the X-Mansion. Jean Grey is the only X-Man on the premises, but with the help of several of the students, such as one who could manifest voices from any direction, she was able to keep the U-Men at bay. The U-Men have many counter-abilities to mutant powers, such as being able to shut down portions of their mind in order to escape telepathic control by the Stepford Cuckoos. Jean manages to both humiliate the U-Men with her telepathy and defeat them with her regrowing Phoenix powers.  As Wolverine and Angel draw up to the mansion, the U-Men are seen running away, screaming into the night as Jean telekinetically destroys their suits and attacks them with psychic fire.

The U-Men are next seen when the first Xorn takes his remedial class, which includes Angel, out on a special camping trip. They are attacked by U-Men forces. Xorn was drawn away, leaving the class to face down a lone U-Men soldier. The students defeat him and Angel, sent to search for Xorn, discovers that Xorn had slain the rest of the force.

Kid Omega and his gang, high on the mutant drug Kick, made a planned attack on a U-Men stronghold, destroying it and killing the men.

A U-man is also seen being killed by angry mutants in Planet X.

"The Third Species" religion
The U-Men were primarily led by Dr. John Sublime until his death. Individuals view his book, The Third Species, to be their bible and the practice of being a U-Man as a legitimate religion, though others, such as mutants, view them as a cult.

U-Man life and philosophy
The Third Species presents Sublime's philosophy that the current world is "tainted" and that followers must not be exposed to the air or touch the earth of the "fallen world" until it has been perfected, hence the special suits. They eat only processed, specialized foods that are deemed "clean," and their suits have automatic waste recycling. They must pay for these suits themselves. They carry weapons used for harvesting mutants, such as propulsion guns that fire razors or bullets.

U-Men act in groups, composed of a "central base", group leaders, and subordinates. They communicate through standard forms of technology and go out into hunting missions to harvest mutants. They often refer to John Sublime's website for guidance and questions.

Sublime's book states that there is a "third species" on Earth called Homo perfectus or "the Recycled Man". The so-called "Third Species" is composed of normal humans who believe it is their right to use mutants and mutant parts to give themselves "chosen mutant" abilities. They do this by capturing mutants and harvesting their organs or other body parts to use either as grafts and implants (such as eyes with x-ray vision or blood transfusions that grant electrical abilities) or as tools (such as Martha the Mutant Brain). Like normal grafts and implants, the mutant organs do not always take, and some U-Men die as a result of the process, such as U-Man Bob Smitt, who died of blood poisoning when his mutant lung grafts rotted inside him. U-Men view the failure of a graft to take as a measure of an individual's "purity" and deservedness to be one of the Third Species.

When a U-Man dies, the other members of his or her team congregate for a short ceremony and then harvest the deceased U-Man's grafted mutant organs for themselves. In doing so, they believe that the fallen U-Man (as well as the mutants whose organs they harvest) will continue to live within them, a form of genetic immortality.

Associations
The U-Men are often viewed as a cult of "geeks" or other young, social outcasts who are easily swayed by the radical philosophy found in John Sublime's book. The Third Species and the U-Men gain public attention when a high schooler holds up a school assembly with a gun and announces to the world that he had killed a school jock, a closeted mutant and gay, for the purpose of harvesting his x-ray vision eyes. The announcement, and his declared intent to join the U-Men and have the eyes transplanted is broadcast on the news. He is subsequently shot and killed by police.

Despite their seemingly small and radical stigma, the U-Man organization is much larger, possibly due to John Sublime's wealth and fame.  The X-Men investigate an issue in Hong Kong and discover a massive illegal mutant organ smuggling operation within John Sublime's Sublime Pharm Solutions building. The building houses several captured mutants, some of which have been operated on and left to die. The facility is massive and contains sophisticated technology and surgical equipment.

Other versions

Here Comes Tomorrow
In Here Comes Tomorrow, an apocalyptic alternate future time line, the last U-Man is known as Apollyon the Destroyer, who serves as a herald for "The Beast" (a Sublime-possessed Hank McCoy). Having suffered several injuries and still being "perfected" with different grafts, Apollyon awaits the day when he will be grafted with the "Phoenix gene" and will become perfect and able to walk on a "perfected world." However, when the Phoenix gene is harvested, Apollyon discovers that the Beast lied to him and intends to harvest the Phoenix gene for himself. When a reawoken Jean Grey extracts the intelligent bacterial entity Sublime from Beast, Apollyon strikes and decapitates Beast out of vengeance. Delusional and believing the world to now be perfected, Apollyon rips off his mask, revealing a face that is horribly disfigured. Despite this, the dying E.V.A. recognizes him and calls out, suggesting that Apollyon's true identity is that of Fantomex.

In other media

Television
 The U-Men appear as the initial antagonists of Marvel Anime: X-Men. Here, they are portrayed as a human supremacist group led by Sublime (but backed by a disguised Mastermind of the Inner Circle) who are trying to harvest mutant body parts/powers similar to their comic book counterparts. One notable member is Kick (voiced by Dave Wittenberg in the English dub), a cyborg who has a past with Wolverine.

As this has so far been their only televised appearance, the U-Men remain obscure to X-Men fans who never read the comics.

Video games
 The U-Men make an appearance as antagonists in X-Men: Destiny. They have formed an alliance with the Purifiers in replicating Mutant powers under Dr. John Sublime.

References

External links
 U-Men at Marvel Wiki
 U-Men at Comic Vine

Fictional cults
Marvel Comics supervillain teams
X-Men supporting characters